Equinunk Historic District is a national historic district located at Buckingham Township and Manchester Township, Wayne County, Pennsylvania. The district includes 55 contributing buildings and 1 contributing site in the community of Equinunk.  The buildings are vernacular interpretations of a variety of popular 19th- and early-20th-century architectural styles including Greek Revival, Italianate, Gothic Revival, Second Empire, and Queen Anne.  Notable buildings include Nelson's Store (c. 1850), Calder House (c. 1836), Nelson House (c. 1875), Barnes House (1901), Bullock's Store (c. 1888), Taft Hotel (c. 1870), Bleck's Hotel (1905), and Equinunk Methodist Church (1895). The contributing site is the Equinunk Cemetery.

It was added to the National Register of Historic Places in 1999.

References

Historic districts on the National Register of Historic Places in Pennsylvania
Italianate architecture in Pennsylvania
Greek Revival architecture in Pennsylvania
Queen Anne architecture in Pennsylvania
Buildings and structures in Wayne County, Pennsylvania
National Register of Historic Places in Wayne County, Pennsylvania